Haddam, in Iran, may refer to:
 Haddam 1
 Haddam 2